Ultrid is a light, flexible and powerful technology that simplifies the software development process of rich client desktop application software by effectively separating the user interface code from the logic of the program.

Ultrid's technology is based on the Ultrid engine acting as a layer runtime over Java. The Ultrid language uses a metalanguage to describe the entire user interface and other services of an application. The functionalities can be written in Java programming language or in one of many scripting languages. The clear separation between the graphical user interface and the code facilitates the development task and adds flexibility.

References 

Java platform software